Kevin Robert Harlan (born June 21, 1960) is an American television and radio sports announcer. The son of former Green Bay Packers executive Bob Harlan, and a two-time National Sportscaster of the Year, he broadcasts NFL and college basketball games on CBS and the NBA for TNT.
2023 will be his 39th consecutive season doing NFL play by play, and 2022-23 will be his 38th year broadcasting the NBA.  He is a two time National Sportscaster of the Year.  Overall he is third all time in the total number of network sports broadcasts doing play by play of one of the four major sports. 

Until 2008, Harlan was the voice of Westwood One Radio's Final Four coverage. In 2010, he began serving as Westwood One's lead announcer for Monday Night Football, calling his first Super Bowl in Super Bowl XLV. He has broadcast 12 consecutive Super Bowls for Westwood One, Super Bowls XLV-LVII. Twelve is the most consecutively in radio, and television, network history (Jack Buck broadcast nine straight). Harlan also broadcast the CBS HD feed of Super Bowl XXXV in 2001. He also calls the preseason games of his hometown Packers for the team's statewide television network since 2003.  In 2017 and 2019, he was voted the National Sportscaster of the Year by his peers. In total, Harlan has broadcast 13 Super Bowls and five Final Fours.  He is one of three broadcasters to have more than 3000 national network broadcasts in his career, along with Dick Stockton and Marv Albert, of the four major sports.

Biography
Harlan began broadcasting as a teenager for his alma mater Our Lady of Premontre High School's high school radio station, WGBP-FM, calling play-by-play for the school's boys' basketball, football and ice hockey teams.  He was recently inducted into the school's Hall of Fame.  He was a ball boy with the Green Bay Packers in his teens during the time that his father, Bob Harlan, was a Packers executive in the front office.  He had originally pursued attending either the University of Wisconsin–Madison or the University of Notre Dame in pursuit of his communications/mass media degree, but a personal recommendation from broadcaster Gary Bender to his dad Bob led Kevin to instead attend the University of Kansas and its School of Journalism and Mass Communications. Harlan was introduced to the Jayhawks' primary basketball play-by-play announcer at the time, Tom Hedrick, who noted Harlan's zeal for sports broadcasting and immediately considered him a protege in the making. Hedrick gave Harlan a sideline position his freshman year, eventually deeming him as his understudy and fill-in announcer on days where he had other commitments. Harlan graduated in 1982 with a broadcast journalism degree.  

In 1982, right out of college, at age 22, Harlan became the TV and radio voice of the NBA's Kansas City Kings (now the Sacramento Kings). He was then a basketball announcer for his alma mater, the University of Kansas, for one year, then went on to call games for the NFL's Kansas City Chiefs from 1985–93 after several years hosting and producing surrounding pre-game and post-game programming while still in college.  Harlan also split time with the University of Missouri (1986–89) calling football and basketball games, and worked as the play-by-play voice of the NBA's Minnesota Timberwolves for nine seasons (1989–98).  On the network level, Harlan called NFL football for NBC in 1991, college football for ESPN in 1992–93, NFL for Fox from 1994–97, and joined Turner Sports in 1996 to broadcast NBA playoff games (he would begin calling games throughout the entire season in 1997, which he continues to do to this day). Harlan broadcast his first NBA All Star game for TNT in 2022, as well the Western Conference Finals.  He began working for CBS in 1998 after four years at FOX..

In addition, Harlan has called Jacksonville Jaguars, Chicago Bears, and Green Bay Packers preseason games; boxing for Mike Tyson vs. Buster Mathis Jr. in 1995; basketball games during the now-defunct Goodwill Games, which were owned by Time Warner; college sports on ESPN; and several bowl games during college football seasons. Harlan has also lent his voice on the NBA 2K video game series since 2005.

In 2017, Harlan was voted by his peers as National Sportscaster of the Year by the NSMA. He again was voted National Sportscaster of the Year by the NSMA in 2019. He was also named 2019 National Sportscaster of the Year by The Athletic.  In September 2019 Harlan was inducted into the Notre Dame Academy High School Hall of Fame (the former Premontre HS he attended in Green Bay, Wisconsin).

Notable calls 
Harlan has a history of injecting humor into situations during games whenever he can, in addition to being able to dramatize even mundane moments not related to the game itself. These include:

May 12, 2008 – Harlan was calling the 2008 Eastern Conference Semifinals featuring the Boston Celtics and the Cleveland Cavaliers, when Cavaliers superstar LeBron James drove to the basket and dunked as Celtics forward Kevin Garnett was rotating unsuccessfully to help on the drive. Harlan's call of the play:

Harlan: Garnett comes out on LeBron. Now they switch and here's Pierce again...a Smith screen. Posey will defend...OHHHHHH! LEBRON JAMES WITH NO REGARD FOR HUMAN LIFE!

September 12, 2016 – Harlan was the radio play-by-play man for Westwood One's coverage of the Monday Night Football game between the San Francisco 49ers and the Los Angeles Rams, where a fan ran onto the field. Harlan then proceeded to give a play-by-play of security chasing the man. Deadspin referred to the call as an "All Timer"."Hey somebody has run out on the field. Some goofball in a hat and a red shirt. Now he takes off the shirt! He’s running down the middle by the 50, he’s at the 30! He’s bare-chested and... BANGING HIS CHEST?! Now he runs the opposite way! He runs to the 50, he runs to the 40, the guy is DRUNK! But there he goes! The 20 — they’re chasing him, but they’re not going to get him! Waving his arms, bare-chested; Somebody stop that man! [Referring to the security] Oh, they got him, they’re coming from the left — Oh and they tackle him at the 40-yard line! [Pause] Whew, that was the most exciting thing to happen tonight."

January 14, 2018 – Harlan called the NFC Divisional Match-up between the New Orleans Saints and Minnesota Vikings for Westwood One Radio, where Stefon Diggs scored on a 61 yard touchdown pass from Case Keenum as time expired, now known as the Minneapolis Miracle. It's third down and 10. Keenum is in the gun from his own 39. Four man front, six in the secondary. Shotgun snap. He moves up, he moves up, he throws a long line drive on the near side, leaping to and catch made! It's made by – oh my goodness, it's gonna go in for the touchdown! Grabbed by Diggs! He broke a tackle! 61 yard touchdown throw! THE VIKINGS HAVE WON! THE MINNESOTA VIKINGS HAVE WON!

May 12, 2019 – Harlan called Game 7 of the 2019 NBA Eastern Conference Semifinals with analyst Greg Anthony, where Kawhi Leonard hit a shot at the buzzer that bounced four times before falling in to win the game and advance the Toronto Raptors to the Eastern Conference Finals. Harlan's call of the play:Harlan: It's off to Leonard, defended by Simmons. Is this the dagger?

[ball bounces four times on the rim, proceeds to go in as buzzer sounds]

Harlan and Anthony: OHHHHHH!

Harlan: GAME! SERIES! TORONTO HAS WON!

November 4, 2019 – Harlan was the radio play-by-play for Westwood One's coverage of a Monday Night Football game between the Dallas Cowboys and New York Giants where a black cat ran onto the field midway in the second quarter. 

"Oh, there's a cat, a black cat has taken the field. A black cat is running from the 20 to the nearside, the 10, from the 39 of Dallas here is a short throw down the middle caught by Engram. Caught at the 35 to the 30, now the cat running the other way and so is Engram at the 25 near the 24 yard line of the Dallas Cowboys. It's a catch-run of 15. Now the cat is stopped at the 50. (Kurt Warner: So is it bad luck for the Giants, or bad luck for the Cowboys?) I don't know, I don't know but they've stopped play, and the players with hands on hips are watching the cat run and zig zag all over the field. The black cat is on the other end of the field. He's at the eight! (Warner: The cat doesn't know that it was last Thursday that was Halloween, Thursday Night Football, not Monday Night Football.) He's a little bit late. (Warner chuckles) Now he is sitting, and looking, now he's at the five... (Warner: Who brought the cat?) He's walking to the three, he's at the two... and the cat is in the CDW Red Zone, CDW, people who get it- Now a policeman, state troopers come on the field- AND THE CAT RUNS IN THE END ZONE! THAT IS A TOUCHDOWN! And the cat is elusive, kind of like Barkley and Elliott, but he didn’t know where to go! Look at it, they're trying to corner him, and they got him in the end zone. There are state troopers all around this cat which now climbs up into the stands, and the fans are running for their li- Now it goes back on the field again and it's running in the back of the end zone, and it runs up the tunnel.”

November 10, 2019 – The following Sunday, Harlan was the play-by-play announcer for a game between the Baltimore Ravens and Cincinnati Bengals. With Baltimore up 28–13 against Cincinnati, Ravens quarterback and MVP favorite Lamar Jackson used a spin move to elude several Bengals defenders for a 47-yard touchdown run in the third quarter, putting the game out of reach. 

"Here's a second down and 3, Jackson takes it himself. Look at him dart back and forth- OHHHHHH! HE BROKE HIS ANKLES! NOW HE'S GOT AN ENTOURAGE! And he's got a touchdown! HE IS HOUDINI! What a play! 47-yard touchdown run by the magical quarterback Lamar Jackson! WOW!"

December 29, 2019 – Harlan was the television play-by-play commentator for the Los Angeles Chargers at the Kansas City Chiefs when he began calling the Miami Dolphins at the New England Patriots game in the Chargers vs Chiefs feed; with a New England loss, the Chiefs would claim the #2 seed in the playoffs and a bye week. 

Meanwhile, Miami has first and goal down by four. And they're at the New England four yard line, first and goal. 29 seconds left. Here (in Kansas City) Butker kicks the extra point. And Fitzpatrick throws in the end zone, touchdown Miami! The Dolphins have just scored! Gesicki, the tight end, got a laser in the back of the end zone on a goal-to-go touchdown pass by Miami quarterback Ryan Fitzpatrick to take a lead with 24 seconds to go! The extra point coming up for Miami, leading New England 26 to 24. And the crowd (in Kansas City) now knows it.

... What a throw by Fitzpatrick, what a touchdown run by Williams, on the last weekend of the regular season in the NFL!

Rich Gannon, the analyst in the booth with Harlan, asked Harlan "I'm getting confused, what game are you calling?", to which Harlan responded with a very enthusiastic "I'M CALLING BOTH GAMES!"

February 7, 2021 – During Super Bowl LV between the Kansas City Chiefs and the Tampa Bay Buccaneers, Harlan was the radio play-by-play announcer when, in the closing minutes of the game, a streaker ran onto the field. The streaker was a man dressed in an undersized women's pink one-piece thong-style swimsuit and a pair of dark athletic shorts.

"Someone has run on the field... some guy with a bra! And now, he's not being chased he's running down the middle the 40. Arms in the air in a victory salute. He's pulling down his pants PUT UP YOUR PANTS MY MAN! PUT UP THOSE PANTS! He's being chased to the 30, he breaks a tackle from a security guard, the 20, down the middle the ten, the five, he slides at the one... and they converge on him at the goal line! (pause) Pull up your pants, take off the bra and be a man!'' And the players with hands on hips at the other end of the field are looking at him and shaking their head, and saying, 'Why, oh, why is this taking place in a Super Bowl?'"

Personal life 
Harlan has been married to his wife Ann for 35 years, and together they have four children and four grandchildren. Their daughter, Olivia, is a sideline reporter for ESPN and is married to NBA player Sam Dekker, also born in Wisconsin (in Sheboygan).

References

External links
 CBS Sports profile

1960 births
Living people
American radio sports announcers
American television sports announcers
Chicago Bears announcers
College basketball announcers in the United States
College football announcers
Green Bay Packers announcers
Kansas City Chiefs announcers
Minnesota Timberwolves announcers
NFL Europe broadcasters
Missouri Tigers football announcers
Missouri Tigers men's basketball announcers
National Basketball Association broadcasters
National Football League announcers
Notre Dame Academy (Green Bay, Wisconsin) alumni
Sacramento Kings announcers
Sportspeople from Milwaukee
University of Kansas alumni